Fedor Lukashenko (born 18 March 1974) is a retired Belarusian professional football player. He has made one appearance for Belarus national football team in 1997.

Honours
Slavia Mozyr
Belarusian Premier League champion: 2000
Belarusian Cup winner: 1999–2000

Gomel
Belarusian Premier League champion: 2003
Belarusian Cup winner: 2001–02

References

External links
 
 
 Profile at teams.by

1974 births
Living people
Belarusian footballers
Belarus international footballers
FC Dinamo-93 Minsk players
FC Slavia Mozyr players
FC Gomel players
FC Darida Minsk Raion players
FC Dynamo Brest players
FC SKVICH Minsk players
FC Molodechno players
FC Veras Nesvizh players
Association football midfielders